Thomas Waddell (1 January 1854 – 25 October 1940), an Australian politician, was a member of the New South Wales Legislative Assembly from 1887 to 1917, was briefly the premier of New South Wales during 1904, and was a member of the New South Wales Legislative Council from 1917 to 1934. His 75 days in office marks the shortest tenure of any New South Wales premier.

Early life
He was born in County Monaghan, Ireland, son of John and Ann Waddell and was brought to Australia when a few months old. He grew up near Lake George, New South Wales, northeast of Canberra and was educated at Collector public school and at George Metcalfe's High School, Goulburn. At 15 he started work as a shop assistant and then became clerk of petty sessions at Collector Court. He began selling cattle and horses in 1876 and spent some time at Cooper Creek in western Queensland. Together with his brother George, he bought three stations in far western New South Wales and managed them for five years before selling them in the boom of the 1880s.

Parliamentary career
In February 1887 he was elected as member for Bourke in the Legislative Assembly and in May 1887 he married Elizabeth, daughter of John James of Orange. In the July 1891 election he lost his seat to James Peter Howe, but won it back again at a by-election following Howe's resignation in October 1891. He was elected as member for Cobar in July 1894 and Cowra in July 1898. In April 1901 he became colonial treasurer in the See government and handled the portfolio well in difficult times. When See resigned in June 1904, he recommended to Governor Sir Harry Rawson that he appoint Paddy Crick, but Rawson did not favour Crick because of his excessive drinking in Executive Council meetings and in due course asked Waddell to be premier.

Two months later Waddell's government faced a general election, and he won re-election to the renamed seat of Belubula, but his Progressive Party lost badly to Joseph Carruthers' Liberal Reform Party and he ceased to be premier, colonial treasurer and justice minister on 29 August. The Labor Party became the official opposition. He attempted to hold the Progressive Party together, but in May 1907 he accepted an offer to become Colonial Secretary in Carruthers Government. The Progressive Party disintegrated after the September 1907 election.

When Charles Wade became premier in October 1907, Waddell became colonial treasurer until the Government's defeat by James McGowen's Labor Party in the 1910 election. As treasurer, he reduced income tax and repealed stamp duty. He remained member for Belubula until 1917 and served in the Legislative Council from 1917 to 1934, when elections to the council were introduced.

Waddell died in Ashfield on 25 October 1940. He was survived by his wife and three sons and four daughters.

Two of his nephews were also members of parliament, John Waddell was the member for Waverley in the Legislative Assembly from 1932 until 1939, and Sir Graham Waddell was a member of the Legislative Council from 1937 until 1949.

In Media
Thomas Waddell is the target of Banjo Paterson's poem The Premier and the Socialist.
https://en.wikisource.org/wiki/The_Premier_and_the_Socialist

Notes

 

 

Premiers of New South Wales
1854 births
1940 deaths
Members of the New South Wales Legislative Assembly
Members of the New South Wales Legislative Council
Treasurers of New South Wales